Tobias Kamke won the title, defeating Paul-Henri Mathieu 7–6(9–7), 6–4 in the final.

Seeds

Draw

Finals

Top half

Bottom half

References
 Main Draw
 Qualifying Draw

ATP Roller Open - Singles
2012 Singles
2012 in Luxembourgian tennis